Déborah Perret is a French voice actress. She is the daughter of Danielle Perret.

Filmography
Les soeurs Hamlet (1996)

Dubbing

Cinema
True Romance (1993)
Seven (1995)
Get Shorty (1995)
Boogie Nights (1997)
Blade (1998)
Small Soldiers (1998)
Beowulf (1999)
Drop Dead Gorgeous (1999)
Forces of Nature (1999)
Magnolia (1999)
Rush Hour 2 (2001)
The Lord of the Rings: The Fellowship of the Ring (2001)
Monster's Ball (2001)
The Rules of Attraction (2002)
The Lord of the Rings: The Two Towers (2002)
Star Trek Nemesis (2002)
The Lord of the Rings: The Return of the King (2003)
Final Destination 2 (2003)
Northfork (2003)
Crash (2004)
The Incredibles (2004)
Assault on Precinct 13 (2005)
The Interpreter (2005)
A History of Violence (2005)
Lonely Hearts (2006)
Love in the Time of Cholera (2007)
The Bank Job (2008)

Television
Santa Barbara (1984-1993)
ER (1995-2003)
Mortal Kombat: Konquest (1998-1999)
Wizards of Waverly Place (2007-2011)
Camp Rock (2008)
Merlin (2008)
Wizards of Waverly Place: The Movie (2009)
Camp Rock 2 (2010)

References

French voice actresses
Living people
Year of birth missing (living people)
Place of birth missing (living people)